Joseph Ignaz Philipp von Hessen-Darmstadt (1699–1768) was the Prince-Bishop of Augsburg from 1740 to 1768.

Early life

Landgrave Joseph Ignaz Philipp von Hessen-Darmstadt was born in Brussels on 22 January 1699, the son of Philip of Hesse-Darmstadt and his wife Princess Marie Ernestine of Croy-Havré (1673–1714), second daughter of Ferdinand Joseph von Croÿ, 3rd Duke of Havré (1644-1694). He was raised partially in Mantua.

Biography
He was ordained as a priest in Augsburg on 13 March 1729.  The cathedral chapter of Augsburg Cathedral elected him to be Prince-Bishop of Augsburg on 18 August 1740 and Pope Benedict XIV confirmed this appointment on 2 January 1741.  He was subsequently consecrated as a bishop by Johann Jakob von Mayr, auxiliary bishop of Augsburg, on 12 February 1741.

On 29 April 1764 the cathedral chapter of Augsburg Cathedral elected Prince Clemens Wenceslaus of Saxony as his coadjutor bishop, an appointment approved by Pope Clement XIII only on the condition that Prince Clemens Wenceslaus of Saxony would renounce his titles of Prince-Bishop of Freising and Prince-Bishop of Regensburg upon becoming Prince-Bishop of Augsburg.

Joseph Ignaz Philipp von Hessen-Darmstadt died in Plombières-les-Bains on 20 August 1768.

See also

References

Bibliography
Alessandro Cont, La Chiesa dei principi. Le relazioni tra Reichskirche, dinastie sovrane tedesche e stati italiani (1688-1763), preface of Elisabeth Garms-Cornides, Trento, Provincia autonoma di Trento, 2018, pp. 165-169, https://www.academia.edu/38170694/La_Chiesa_dei_principi._Le_relazioni_tra_Reichskirche_dinastie_sovrane_tedesche_e_stati_italiani_1688-1763_prefazione_di_Elisabeth_Garms-Cornides_Trento_Provincia_autonoma_di_Trento_2018

1699 births
1768 deaths
Roman Catholic bishops of Augsburg